Fiona Alexandra Burnet (born 10 October 1996) is a field hockey player from Scotland, who plays as a forward.

Personal life
Fiona Burnet was born in Alexandria and raised in Helensburgh, Scotland. 

Burnet is also a member of the eco-atheltes group.

Career

Under–21
Jennifer Eadie made her debut for the Scotland U–21 team in 2014 at the EuroHockey Junior Championship II in Vienna.

Senior team
Fiona Burnet also made her senior international debut for Scotland in 2014, during a test series against Germany.

In 2022, Burnet was named in the national squad for the XXII Commonwealth Games in Birmingham.

References

External links

1996 births
Living people
Scottish female field hockey players
Female field hockey forwards
21st-century Scottish women
People educated at Lomond School